The 2010–11 season was Cardiff City F.C.'s 84th in the Football League since joining in 1920. The season has been nicknamed "I'll be there", which is to promoted celebrating 100 years as a club under its current name. They will play their eighth consecutive year in the second tier of English football, the Football League Championship, after being beaten by Blackpool in the play-off final last season. Malaysian businessman Datuk Chan Tien Ghee became the successor of Peter Ridsdale as Cardiff City chairman. The £6m deal was confirmed on 27 May 2010.

Season review

"I'll be there"
Cardiff City released a new initiative for the 2010–11 season, as their "I'll be there" campaign. The nickname comes from one of the earliest songs sung by City fans, since the early 1920s. Cardiff's new board has renamed the Level Four area of Cardiff City Stadium the "Centenary Suite". The season tickets and tickets will be printed with the popular white and yellow strips of the 70s.

Events
 – The £6 million deal for the club is agreed between the Malaysian businessman Datuk Chan Tien Ghee and Peter Ridsdale. Gethin Jenkins (CEO), Doug Lee (finance director) and non-executive directors, Paul Guy, U-Jiun Tan and Michael Isaac join Steve Borley and Alan Whiteley on the board whilst Alan Flitcroft and Keith Harris step down alongside Ridsdale.
 – Cardiff pay off £1.9m of debt to HM Revenue and Customs.
 – The winding-up petition placed against the club by HM Revenue & Customs is withdrawn.
 – Cardiff postpone their Malaysian pre-season tour until next season.
 – Cardiff are hit with a transfer embargo due to tax troubles, but chief executive Gethin Jenkins states that the club is confident it will paid off.
 – Cardiff pay off £1.3m of tax to HM Revenue & Customs, but the transfer embargo stays in place due to the club not submitting year-end accounts for May 2009.]
 – Cardiff confirm that their transfer embargo is lifted. They register their three summer signings with the Football League.
 – Dave Jones confirms that loan signing Craig Bellamy will be team captain and Mark Hudson will be club captain. Cardiff pay Motherwell half of their £175,000, which is owed to them for the transfer of Paul Quinn.
 – Cardiff complete the payment of £175,000 to Motherwell, for the transfer of Paul Quinn.
 – Jay Bothroyd is called up to England team to play France on 17 November. Bothroyd is the first Cardiff City player to be called up to the England team in their 111-year history.
 – Cardiff City are fined £5,000 for being unable to control their players against Reading on 1 February 2010 at the Cardiff City Stadium

Championship data

Standings

Results summary

Result round by round

Kits

|
|
|
|
|
|

Squad

All appearances and goals are correct to 30 June 2011.

Statistics

|-
|colspan="14"|Players played for Cardiff City this season but who have left the club:

|}

Captains

Goalscoring record

Disciplinary record

Suspensions

Penalties

International Call-ups

* This includes all caps up until 1 July 2011.

Transfers

Ins

 Total spending:  ~ £0,400,000

Notes 1Officially undisclosed but reported to be around £300,000.

Loans in

Out

notes:
1Although officially undisclosed, it was reported by Vital Football that the fee was £400,000.

 Total income:  ~ £475,000

Loans out

Contracts

Fixtures and results

Preseason

Football League Championship

Play-offs

FA Cup

Football League Cup

Overall summary

League Score Overview

Club staff

Backroom staff

Board of directors

Honours

 Individual
 October Football League Championship Manager of the Month: Dave Jones
 October Football League Championship Play of the Month: Jay Bothroyd

End-of-season awards

Source: cardiffcity-mad.co.uk,

External links

References

2010-11
2010–11 Football League Championship by team
Welsh football clubs 2010–11 season